William Dunlap Simpson House is a historic home located at Laurens, Laurens County, South Carolina, USA. It was built about 1839 for a planter to use as his town house. The three-story, three bay, Greek Revival style clapboard dwelling has a total of twelve rooms.

It was later the home of Congressman and South Carolina Governor William Dunlap Simpson (1823-1890).

It was added to the National Register of Historic Places in 1974.  It is located in the Laurens Historic District.

References

Houses on the National Register of Historic Places in South Carolina
Greek Revival houses in South Carolina
Houses completed in 1839
Houses in Laurens County, South Carolina
National Register of Historic Places in Laurens County, South Carolina
Historic district contributing properties in South Carolina